Kim Oh-gyu (born 20 June 1989) is a South Korean footballer who plays as a defender for Gangwon FC.

Club career statistics

External links 

1989 births
Living people
Association football defenders
South Korean footballers
Gangwon FC players
Gimcheon Sangmu FC players
K League 1 players
K League 2 players
People from Gangneung